Cosmopolitans Football Club is a Tanzanian football club who plays in the Tanzanian Second Division League. The club is based in Dar es Salaam.

In 1967 the team has won the Tanzanian Premier League.

Stadium
Currently the team plays at the 5000 capacity Chamazi Stadium.

Honours
Tanzanian Premier League
Champions (1): 1967

Performance in CAF competitions
 African Cup of Champions Clubs: 1 appearance
1968 – First Round

References

External links
 Tanzania – List of Foundation Dates – rsssf.com
 Team profile – calciozz.it

Football clubs in Tanzania
Sport in Dar es Salaam